The Ministry of Industry and Trade of the Czech Republic is a government ministry, which was established in 1992.

List of Ministers of Industry and Trade

External links
 

Czech Republic
Industry and Trade
Ministries established in 1992
1992 establishments in Czechoslovakia